Dyan Sheldon is an American novelist, who has written for adults, children and young adults. Originally from Brooklyn, she resides in London and has written a number of young adult novels as well as many picture books in a variety of genres. Her young adult science-fiction novel Perfect was published under the name "D. M. Quintano", as it was a departure from her usual style.

Dyan Sheldon's novel Confessions of a Teenage Drama Queen, a #1 New York Times bestseller, was made into a movie of the same name by Disney in 2004, starring Lindsay Lohan.

Selected bibliography

Adult novels
 Victim of Love (1982)
 Dreams of an Average Man (1985)
 My Life as a Whale (1992)

Young adult novels
 You Can Never Go Home Anymore (1993)
 Confessions of a Teenage Drama Queen (1999)
 And Baby Makes Two (2000)
 My Perfect Life (2002)
 Planet Janet (2003)
 Sophie Pitt-Turnbull Discovers America (2005)
 Perfect (as D. M. Quintano) (2005)
 I Conquer Britain (2006)
 My Worst Best Friend (2010)
 Confessions of a Hollywood Star (2005)
 Away for the weekend (2011)
 Tall, Thin and Blonde (2012)
 More than one way to be a girl (2017)

Children's novels
 Harry and Chicken (1990)
 My Brother Is a Visitor from Another Planet (1992)
 Only Binky (1993)
 Bad Place for a Bus Stop (1994)
 Lizzie and Charley Go Shopping (1999)
 Undercover Angel (2000)
 The Difficulties of Keeping Time (2008)

Picture books
 The Whales' Song (1991)
 Under the Moon (1994) (alternative title, The Garden)
 Unicorn Dreams (1997) (alternative title, Unicorn City)
 The Last Angel (2003)
 Vampire Across the Way (2004)

References

External links
 
 Dyan Sheldon at Fantastic Fiction
 

Living people
20th-century American novelists
21st-century American novelists
American children's writers
American women novelists
American women children's writers
20th-century American women writers
21st-century American women writers
Year of birth missing (living people)